Kamal Hameed Qureshi (born 29 July 1970) is a Danish-Pakistani politician.

Life 
Born in Rawalpindi, Pakistan, he moved with his parents to Copenhagen, Denmark at the age of four.

After attending Tårnby High School Qureshi studied medicine at the University of Copenhagen, graduating as a medical doctor in 2000. 
Qureshi is a member of the Socialist People's Party and has been a member of the Danish parliament, the Folketing, from 2001 to 2011.

Kamal Qureshi was his party’s spokesperson on health and minority issues.

Kamal Qureshi is, furthermore, a party representative in the OSCE (Organization for Security and Cooperation in Europe).

He has contributed to various publications on multiculturalism and equal rights and is an active participant in the public debate in Denmark as well as a popular lecturer.

Throughout the years Kamal Qureshi has participated in humanitarian work, and been involved in association work. Among other things, he has been with a humanitarian organisation “Folkekirkens Nødhjælp” in Iraq, working as a doctor, during the war. 
He started the campaign “Room for diversity”, in 2004, as a protest against the Danish government’s view of humanity.

Two times, the national association for homosexuals, has given him the title: politician of the year, because of his many legislative proposals and happenings on the subject.

Qureshi has been involved in a controversy regarding alleged fraud by illegal subletting of his apartment in Copenhagen. In the end the police did not find that any charges could be made.

In 2008 a newspaper wrote, that Qureshi in his student days, on one occasion had cheated on an exam by submitting another student's paper in his own name.

As a result of these public debates, the Socialist People's Party temporarily relieved Qureshi of all responsibilities in Parliament in 2008.

Qureshi is no longer a member of the parliament, though still is the Socialist Party’s spokesman on human rights and minority issues.

References

External links 
 Official home page 
 

1970 births
Living people
Politicians from Rawalpindi
Socialist People's Party (Denmark) politicians
Danish people of Punjabi descent
Pakistani emigrants to Denmark
Members of the Folketing 2001–2005
Members of the Folketing 2005–2007
Members of the Folketing 2007–2011